In enzymology, a procollagen galactosyltransferase is an enzyme that catalyzes the chemical reaction

UDP-galactose + procollagen 5-hydroxy-L-lysine  UDP + procollagen 5-(D-galactosyloxy)-L-lysine

Thus, the two substrates of this enzyme are UDP-galactose and procollagen 5-hydroxy-L-lysine, whereas its two products are UDP and procollagen 5-(D-galactosyloxy)-L-lysine.

This enzyme belongs to the family of glycosyltransferases, specifically the hexosyltransferases.  The systematic name of this enzyme class is UDP-galactose:procollagen-5-hydroxy-L-lysine D-galactosyltransferase. Other names in common use include hydroxylysine galactosyltransferase, collagen galactosyltransferase, collagen hydroxylysyl galactosyltransferase, UDP galactose-collagen galactosyltransferase, uridine diphosphogalactose-collagen galactosyltransferase, and UDPgalactose:5-hydroxylysine-collagen galactosyltransferase.  This enzyme participates in lysine degradation.

References

 
 

EC 2.4.1
Enzymes of unknown structure